Cedars is an unincorporated community in Worcester Township in Montgomery County, Pennsylvania, United States. Cedars is located at the intersection of Pennsylvania Route 73 and Bustard Road.

References

Unincorporated communities in Montgomery County, Pennsylvania
Unincorporated communities in Pennsylvania